Bishagang is a metro station of Zhengzhou Metro Line 1.

The station lies beneath the crossing of Jianshe Road and Baihua Road, about 500m west of the Bishagang Park.

Station layout 
The station has 2 floors underground. The B1 floor is for the station concourse and the B2 floor is for the platforms and tracks. The station has one island platform and two tracks for Line 1.

Exits

Surroundings
Bishagang Park (碧沙岗公园)
Zhongyuan Commercial City (中原商贸城)

References

External links

Stations of Zhengzhou Metro
Line 1, Zhengzhou Metro
Railway stations in China opened in 2013